The Eparchy of Palghat is a diocese of the Syro-Malabar Catholic Church, centred on the town of Palakkad in the state of Kerala, in South India.  It is a suffragan bishopric of the Archdiocese of Trichur. The current bishop is Peter Kochupurackal, who was appointed in 2022.

History of Diocese of Palghat (Palakkad)

The Eparchy of Palghat was erected on 20 June 1974, through the Decree "Apostolico Requirente" by Pope Paul VI, bifurcating the eparchy of Trichur and adding into the territory of the new eparchy a few parishes of the eparchy of Tellichery, which were in the district of Palakkad. It was a suffragan of the Archdiocese of Ernakulam. The eparchy was inaugurated on 8 September 1974. The episcopal ordination of Msgr. Joseph Irimpen and his assumption of office as the first bishop of the eparchy took place on the same day. It is now a suffragan of the Archdiocese of Trichur. The eparchy covers an area of 28515 km2 and it comprises the civil district of Palakkad in Kerala and the districts of Coimbatore, Erode, Karur and Tirupur in Tamil Nadu. At the time of the inauguration of the Eparchy it had a total of 16 parishes and 8 stations. The number of diocesan priests was 14 and that of the adherents was 20810. It has now 69057 adherents, 127 priests incarnated to it and 99 parishes and 45 stations. Bishop Irimpen retired from his office on 6 December 1994 and died on 23 August 1997. Msgr. Joseph Veliyathil served the Eparchy as its Administrator from 6 December 1994 to 1 February 1997. Pope John Paul II nominated Bishop Jacob Manathodath, then the Auxiliary Bishop of Ernakulam-Angamaly as the Bishop of Palghat on 11 November 1996. Bishop Manathodath took canonical possession of the eparchy on 1 February 1997.

The diocese of Palghat was bifurcated and a new diocese, named Ramanathapuram, was erected on 18 January 2010.

Statistics of the Diocese of Palghat
Diocese of Palghat - Geographical Area, 4,480 km2 (Palakkad Dt)
  Catholic Families:   12,521
  Catholics:           56,668
  Priests:
 Diocesan	           121
 Working	             8
 Religious Men	59
 Religious Women      1,051
 Diocesan Seminarians 	:
 Theologians	15
 Regents	11
 Philosophers			25
 Minor Seminarians		34
  Foranes		8
  Parishes		74
  Stations		43

References

External links
Syro-Malabar Catholic Diocese of Palghat
Catholic-Hierarchy entry

Eastern Catholic dioceses in India
Archdiocese of Thrissur
Syro-Malabar Catholic dioceses
Christian organizations established in 1974
Roman Catholic dioceses and prelatures established in the 20th century
1974 establishments in Kerala